Joji Nagashima (born 1955; 永島譲二) is an automobile designer for BMW.  Nagashima was born in Tokyo and educated in Japan. He is best known for the exterior designs of the E90 versions of the BMW 3 Series, the E39 version of the BMW 5 Series, and the Z3 Roadster.  He has been granted 22 patents in car design (as of Nov. 2007).

Timeline 
 1955 - born in Tokyo .
 1978 - graduated from Musashino Art University Department of Craft and Industrial Design,.
 1980 - Master's degree in industrial design at  Wayne State University.  Joined Opel .
 1986 - Joined Renault .
 1988 - Joined BMW .
 2009 - Visiting professor at Kyoto Seika University design department .
 2015 - Visiting professor at Tokyo University of Technology Design department .

List of Design Patents

2005 
D514,491 - 	Surface configuration of a trunk lid for a vehicle

2004 

D516,480 - 	Surface configuration of a side mirror for a vehicle
D514,990 - 	Surface configuration of a front bumper for a vehicle
D514,985 - 	Surface configuration of a vehicle, toy and/or other replicas
D514,484 - 	Surface configuration of a hood for a vehicle
D513,601 - 	Surface configuration of a trunk lid for a vehicle
D512,675 - 	Front face of a vehicle wheel
D512,673 - 	Surface configuration of a rear fender for a vehicle
D511,725 - 	Surface configuration of a rear bumper for a vehicle
D511,486 - 	Surface configuration of a front fender for a vehicle
D511,129 - 	Surface configuration of a side door for a vehicle
D511,128 - 	Surface configuration of a side door for a vehicle

1995 
D385,524 - 	Front face of a vehicle wheel
D384,629 - 	Front face of a vehicle wheel

1994 
D406,252 - 	Automobile
D375,715 - 	Exterior surface of a trunk lid for an automobile
D374,206 - 	Exterior facing surface configuration of a side panel grille for an automobile
D374,202 - 	Exterior surface of an automobile hood
D374,201 - 	Exterior surface of a rear bumper for an automobile
D372,695 - 	Exterior surface of a front bumper for an automobile
D371,328 - 	Exterior surface configuration of an automobile

External links 
 BMW Designers  An overview of automotive designers working for BMW.

BMW designers
Living people
Japanese expatriates in Germany
People from Tokyo
Japanese automobile designers
1955 births